The Scottish National Cricket League was formed for the 1999 season after a conference season in 1998. Clubs from the four main district leagues and the Scottish Counties Championship formed the league. The NoSCA and Aberdenshire Grades leagues stayed separate. 32 cricket clubs will compete in the 2011 league, divided across two divisions: the Premiership; and the Championship.

See also
Cricket in Scotland

References

External links
SNCL Statistics Archive, Cricket Scotland

Scottish domestic cricket competitions
1999 establishments in Scotland
1999 in cricket
Recurring sporting events established in 1999
Cricket